The Ogren Motor Car Company was a vintage era luxury automobile manufacturer based in Chicago, Illinois from 1915 to 1917 and in Milwaukee, Wisconsin from 1920 to 1923.

History in Illinois 
In the fall of 1914, Hugo W. Ogren founded the company in Chicago to build one-off race cars, but in 1915, he started to produce a six-cylinder touring car.  In 1915 prototypes were made, but in 1916 capital stock increased to $1,000,000, and Ogren moved his company to a larger factory at Waukegan, Illinois. From 1916 he produced a line of six-cylinder cars but in 1917 the company ran out of operating cash.  The factory was sold at auction on Nov. 22, 1917.

Models

History in Wisconsin 
In 1919, the company was re-established and the Elite ice skating rink in Milwaukee, Wisconsin was remodeled into a factory. The first Ogren Six did not appear until July 1920. The new automobiles were more expensive and more powerful with a Beaver engine (65 hp vs. 34 hp).  In 1922, the Beaver engine was replaced with a more powerful Continental engine.  Price for the luxury car ranged from $4,250 to $5,500.

Late in 1922, Hugo Ogren left the company to join another automobile venture.  Fred G. Smith took over and attempted  to re-organize with only limited success.  In January of 1924 the tools and property of Ogren Motor Car Company were sold to Huffman Bros. Motor Co of Elkhart, Indiana.

Models

Gallery

See also

References

Motor vehicle manufacturers based in Illinois
Motor vehicle manufacturers based in Wisconsin
Defunct motor vehicle manufacturers of the United States
History of Milwaukee
Luxury vehicles
Luxury motor vehicle manufacturers
Vintage vehicles
1910s cars
1920s cars
Vehicle manufacturing companies established in 1915
Vehicle manufacturing companies disestablished in 1923
Cars introduced in 1915